The Silver Logie for Most Popular Actor is an award presented annually at the Australian TV Week Logie Awards. The award recognises the popularity of an actor in an Australian program.

It was first awarded at the 19th Annual TV Week Logie Awards, held in 1977 when the award category was originally called Most Popular Australian Lead Actor. It was later renamed  Most Popular Actor and briefly Best Actor (2016–2017). For the 2018 ceremony, the award category name was reverted to Most Popular Actor.

The winner and nominees of Most Popular Actor are chosen by the public through an online voting survey on the TV Week website. Paul Cronin and Martin Sacks hold the record for the most wins, with five each, followed by Grant Dodwell, Craig McLachlan and Hugh Sheridan with three wins each.

Winners and nominees

Multiple wins

Programs with most awards

References

Awards established in 1977